Hugra Union is a union of Tangail Sadar Upazila, Tangail District, Bangladesh.

Demographics
According to the 2011 Bangladesh census, Hugra Union had 7,073 households and a population of 34,490. The literacy rate (age 7 and over) was 37% (male: 42.2%, female: 31.8%).

See also
 Union Councils of Tangail District

References

Populated places in Tangail District
Unions of Tangail Sadar Upazila